Edward Thomas Hughes (November 13, 1920 – December 25, 2012) was an American prelate of the Catholic Church who served as Bishop of Metuchen, New Jersey from 1987 to 1997.

Biography
Hughes was born in Lansdowne, Pennsylvania, to Charles and Kathryn (née Mingey) Hughes. He was the grandson of Irish immigrants. He attended West Philadelphia Catholic High School, and studied for the priesthood at St. Charles Borromeo Seminary in Overbrook. He was ordained a priest for the Archdiocese of Philadelphia on May 31, 1947.  After his ordination, he taught at St. James High School in Chester and later served as superintendent of Catholics schools from 1961 until 1970, when he was named pastor of Our Lady of Fatima Church in Secane.

On June 14, 1976, Hughes was appointed auxiliary bishop of Philadelphia and titular bishop of Segia by Pope Paul VI. He received his episcopal consecration on the following July 21 from Cardinal John Krol, with Bishops Gerald Vincent McDevitt and John Joseph Graham serving as co-consecrators. As an auxiliary bishop, he continued to serve at Our Lady of Fatima Church.

Hughes was appointed the second Bishop of Metuchen in New Jersey on December 11, 1986, and was installed on February 5, 1987. He reached the retirement age of 75 on November 13, 1995. When his resignation was accepted by the Holy See on July 7, 1997, he became bishop emeritus. He was outspoken in his beliefs against racism and abortion. Hughes continued to perform confirmations and celebrate Masses throughout the Diocese of Metuchen for many years after his retirement. He died on December 25, 2012, at the age of 92.

In November 2020, a Vatican investigation into the case of defrocked former cardinal Theodore McCarrick identified Hughes as one of three bishops who "provided inaccurate and incomplete information to the Holy See regarding McCarrick’s sexual conduct with young adults" when McCarrick was a candidate for the post of Archbishop of Washington in 2000, though Hughes' conclusion was that it would be "unwise to consider the Archbishop for any promotion or additional honor".

References

External links
United States Conference of Catholic Bishops press release (July 8, 1997) – Bp. Hughes Resigns in Metuchen; Msgr. Vincent Breen is Successor
The Catholic Spirit, April 5, 2007, Vol. 12, No. 6 – Teens hear messages of hope about chastity Reports on closing remarks by Hughes.

1920 births
2012 deaths
20th-century Roman Catholic bishops in the United States
St. Charles Borromeo Seminary alumni
American people of Irish descent